Pyramidelloides angulatus is a species of sea snail, a marine gastropod mollusk in the family Eulimidae. The species is one of a number within the genus Pyramidelloides.

References

 Jickeli, C. F. (1882). Diagnosen neuer Conchylien. Jahrbücher der Deutschen Malakozoologischen Gesellschaft. 9: 366-370.
 Higo, S., Callomon, P. & Goto, Y. (1999) Catalogue and Bibliography of the Marine Shell-Bearing Mollusca of Japan. Elle Scientific Publications, Yao, Japan, 749 pp.

External links
 To World Register of Marine Species

Eulimidae
Gastropods described in 1882